Live in Krefeld by Nina Hagen was recorded at Kulturfabrik in Krefeld and released in 2001.

Track listing 

 "Schritt für Schritt ins Paradies" previously unreleased
 "Schachmatt" originally from Return of the Mother
 "Revolution" previously unreleased
 "Frequenzkontrolle" originally from Return of the Mother
 "Das Veilchen" previously unreleased
 "Höllenzug" originally from Return of the Mother
 "Zero Zero U.F.O." originally from FreuD euch
 "Tiere" originally from FreuD euch
 "African Reggae" originally from Unbehagen
 "Nina 4 President" originally from Street
 "Revolution Ballroom" originally from Revolution Ballroom
 "I'm Gonna Live the Life" originally from Revolution Ballroom
 "My Sweet Lord" previously unreleased
 "Born to Die in Berlin" originally from BeeHappy
 "Der Wind hat mir ein Lied erzählt" originally from Return of the Mother
 "Pank" originally from Nina Hagen Band
 "My Way" originally from Nina Hagen in Ekstasy
 "Freiheitslied" originally from FreuD euch
 "Riesenschritt" originally from FreuD euch
 "Ska" previously unreleased
 "Deutschland ich liebe Dich" previously unreleased
 "TV-Glotzer (White Punks On Dope)" originally from Nina Hagen Band
 "Ave Maria" originally from Nina Hagen

Information about releases refers to official Nina Hagen albums

Nina Hagen albums
2001 live albums
German-language live albums